Ma Mingfang (December 14, 1905 – August 12, 1974), né Ruzhou (汝舟), art name Jimin (济民), was a People's Republic of China politician and early leader of CCP in Shaanxi. Born in Yejiacha (叶家岔) village, Mizhi county, Shaanxi, Ma joined the Party in 1925 when he studied in No.4 normal school of Shaanxi. He was the first Chinese Communist Party Committee Secretary of his home province of Shaanxi (October 1949 – August 1954) and governor of Shaanxi (January 1950 – August 1954). He was an alternate member of the 7th Central Committee of the Chinese Communist Party and a full member of the 8th Central Committee of the Chinese Communist Party. He died in Beijing during the Cultural Revolution.

References

People's Republic of China politicians from Shaanxi
Chinese Communist Party politicians from Shaanxi
Governors of Shaanxi
Political office-holders in Shaanxi
Communist University of the Toilers of the East alumni
Members of the 8th Central Committee of the Chinese Communist Party
Alternate members of the 7th Central Committee of the Chinese Communist Party
Members of the Standing Committee of the 2nd National People's Congress
Members of the Standing Committee of the 1st National People's Congress
Members of the 1st Chinese People's Political Consultative Conference
1905 births
1974 deaths